Ioannis Giannoulis (born January 8, 1988 in Thessaloniki, Greece) is a Greek Olympic swimmer. He swam for Greece at the 2008 Olympics.

References

External links
 

1988 births
Living people
Greek male swimmers
Olympic swimmers of Greece
Swimmers at the 2008 Summer Olympics
Mediterranean Games bronze medalists for Greece
Mediterranean Games medalists in swimming
Swimmers at the 2009 Mediterranean Games
Swimmers from Thessaloniki